The Glorious Order of the Crown of Kedah (Bahasa Melayu: Darjah Kebesaran Gemilang Sri Mahkota Kedah)  is an honorific order of the Sultanate of Kedah

History 
It was founded by Sultan Abdul Halim of Kedah in January 2001.

Classes 
It is awarded in three classes: 
 Knight Commander or Dato' Wira (DGMK) with title  Dato' Wira (Knight Hero)
 Companion or Setia (GMK)
 Member or Ahli (AGK)

References 

Kedah
Orders, decorations, and medals of Kedah